In economics, a utility representation theorem is a theorem asserting that, under certain conditions, a preference ordering can be represented by a real-valued utility function, such that option A is preferred to option B if and only if the utility of A is larger than that of B.

Background 
Suppose a person is asked questions of the form "Do you prefer A or B?" (when A and B can be options, actions to take, states of the world, consumption bundles, etc.). If the agent prefers A to B, we write . The set of all such preference-pairs forms the person's preference relation. 

Instead of recording the person's preferences between every pair of options, it would be much more convenient to have a single utility function - a function u that assigns a real number to each option, such that  if and only if .

Not every preference-relation has a utility-function representation. For example, if the relation is not transitive (the agent prefers A to B, B to C, and C to A), then it has no utility representation, since any such utility function would have to satisfy , which is impossible.

A utility representation theorem gives conditions on a preference relation, that are sufficient for the existence of a utility representation.

Often, one would like the representing function u to satisfy additional conditions, such as continuity. This requires additional conditions on the preference relation.

Definitions 
The set of options is a topological space denoted by X. In some cases we assume that X is also a metric space; in particular, X can be a subset of a Euclidean space Rm, such that each coordinate in {1,...,m} represents a commodity, and each m-vector in X represents a possible consumption bundle.

Preference relations 
It is denoted by either  or :

 The notation  is used when the relation is strict, that is,  means that option A is strictly better than option B. In this case, the relation should be irreflexive, that is,  does not hold. It should also be asymmetric, that is,  implies that not .
 The notation  is used when the relation is weak, that is,  means that option A is at least as good as option B (A may be equivalent to B, or better than B). In this case, the relation should be reflexive, that is,  always holds. 
Given a weak preference relation , one can define its "strict part"  and "indifference part"  as follows:

  if and only if  and not .

Given a strict preference relation , one can define its "weak part"  and "indifference part"  as follows:

  if and only if not ;
  if and only if not  and not .

For every option , we define the contour sets at A: 

 Given a weak preference relation , the weak upper contour set at A is the set of all options that are at least as good as A:  . The weak lower contour set at A is the set of all options that are at most as good as A:  . 
 A weak preference relation is called continuous if its contour sets are topologically closed. 
 Similarly, given a strict preference relation , the strict upper contour set at A is the set of all options  better than  A:  , and the strict lower contour set at A is the set of all options  worse than A:  . 
 A strict preference relation is called continuous if its contour sets are topologically open. 

A preference-relation is called:

 Countable - if the set of equivalence classes of the indiffference relation  is countable.
 Separable - if there exists a countable subset  such that for every pair , there is an element  that separates them, that is,  (an analogous definition exists for weak relations). 

As an example, the strict order ">" on real numbers is separable, but not countable.

Utility functions 
A utility function is a function .

 A utility function u is said to represent a strict preference relation , if .
 A utility function u is said to represent a weak preference relation , if .

Complete preference relations 
Debreu proved the existence of a contiuous representation of a weak preference relation  satisfying the following conditions:

 Reflexive and Transitive;
 For all , both the upper and the lower weak contour sets are topologically closed;
 The space X is second-countable. This means that there is a countable set S of open sets, such that every open set in X is the union of sets of the class S. Second-countability is implied by the following properties (from weaker to stronger): 
 The space X is separable and connected. 
 The relation   is separable. 
 The relation   is countable.
Jaffray gives an elementary proof to the existence of a continuous utility function.

Incomplete preference relations 
Preferences are called incomplete when some options are incomparable, that is, neither  nor   holds. There are several ways to cope with this issue.

One-directional representation 
Peleg defined a utility function representation of a strict partial order  as a function  such that, that is, only one direction of implication should hold. Peleg proved the existence of a one-dimensional continuous utility representation of a strict preference relation  satisfying the following conditions:   

 Irreflexive and transitive (which implies that it is asymmetric, that is, is a strict partial order);
 Separable;
 For all , the lower strict contour set at A is topologically open;
 Spacious: if , then the lower strict contour set at A contains the closure of the lower strict contour set at B.
 This condition is required for incomplete preference relations. For complete preference relations, every relation in which all lower and upper strict contour sets are open, is also spacious.
If we are given a weak preference relation , we can apply Peleg's theorem by defining a strict preference relation:  if and only if  and not .

The second condition ( is separable) is implied by the following three conditions:

 The space X is separable;
 For all , both lower and upper strict contour sets at A are topologically open;
 If the lower countour set of A is nonempty, then A is in its closure.

A similar approach was taken by Richter. Therefore, this one-directional representation is also called a Richter-Peleg utility representation.

He proved that, for every partially-ordered space  that is perfectly-separable, there exists a utility function that is upper-semicontinuous in any topology stronger than the upper order topology. An analogous statement states the existence of a utility function that is lower-semicontinuous in any topology stronger than the lower order topology.

Sondermann defines a utility function representation similarly to Jaffray. He gives conditions for existence of a utility function representation on a probability space, that is upper semicontinuous or lower semicontinuous in the order topology.

Herden defines a utility function representation of a weak preorder  as an isotone function  such that . Herden proved that  a weak preorder  on X has a continuous utility function, if and only if there exists a countable family E of separable systems on X such that, for all pairs , there is a separable system F in E, such that B is contained in all sets in F, and A is not contained in any set in F. He shows that this theorem implies Peleg's representation theorem. In a follow-up paper he clarifies the relation between this theorem and classical utility representation theorems on complete orders.

Multi-utility representation 
A multi-utility representation (MUR) of a relation  is a set U of utility functions, such that . In other words, A is preferred to B if and only if all utility functions in the set U unanimously hold this preference. The concept was introduced by Efe Ok.    

Every preorder (reflexive and transitive relation) has a trivial MUR. Moreover, every preorder with closed upper contour sets has an upper-semicontinuous MUR, and every preorder with closed lower contour sets has a lower-semicontinuous MUR. However, not every preorder with closed upper and lower contour sets has a continuous MUR. Ok and Evren present several conditions on the existence of a continuous MUR:   

  has a continuous MUR if-and-only-if (X,) is a semi-normally-preordered topological space.  
This in particular holds if X is a nonempty closed subset of a Euclidean space.

All the representations guaranteed by the above theorems might contain infinitely many utilities, and even uncountably many utilities. In practice, it is often important to have a finite MUR - a MUR with finitely many utilities. Evren and Ok prove there exists a finite MUR where all utilities are upper[lower] semicontinuous for any weak preference relation  satisfying the following conditions: 

 Reflexive and Transitive (that is,  is a weak preorder);
 All upper[lower] contour sets are topologically closed;
 The space X is second-countable, that is, it has a countable basis.
Note that the guaranteed functions are semicontinuous, but not necessarily continuous, even if all upper and lower contour sets are closed.  Evren and Ok say that "there does not seem to be a natural way of deriving a continuous finite multi-utility representation theorem, at least, not by using the methods adopted in this paper".

See also 

 Von Neumann-Morgenstern utility theorem
 Revealed preference theory deals with representing the demand function of an agent by a preference relation, or by a utility function.

References 

Utility
Economics theorems